Lincoln, Nebraska held an election for mayor on May 7, 2019, being preceded by an April 9 general primary. It saw the election of Leirion Gaylor Baird.

Background
Incumbent Democratic mayor Chris Beutler was prevented from running by a term-limits amendment to the city charter that was approved by voters on November 6, 2018. In the summer of 2018, several prominent Republican politicians successfully led a petition drive for an amendment to the city charter that would limit the Lincoln mayor to serving three consecutive terms. The amendment would apply retroactively, thereby prohibiting Beutler from running for a fourth term in the 2019 municipal election.

Primary
The primary was held on April 9.

General election

References

Local elections in Nebraska
2019 United States mayoral elections
2019 Nebraska elections
History of Lincoln, Nebraska